Celia & Johnny is the first collaborative album between the duo of Celia Cruz and Johnny Pacheco. It was released in 1974 by Vaya Records. In 2014, the Library of Congress named it to the National Recording Registry as "culturally, historically, or aesthetically significant". In 2015, it was selected by Billboard magazine as one of the "50 Essential Latin Albums of the Last 50 Years".

Track listing
Side A
 "Quimbara" [4:55]
 "Toro Mata" [5:38]
 "Vieja Luna" [3:12]
 "El Paso del Mulo" [4:40]
 "Tengo el Idde" [4:59]

Side B
 "Lo Tuyo Es Mental" [3:12]
 "Canto a La Habana" [5:30]
 "No Mercedes" [4:16]
 "El Tumbao y Celia" [4:51]
 "El Pregón del Pescador" [5:03]

References

1974 albums
Celia Cruz albums
United States National Recording Registry recordings
Salsa albums
United States National Recording Registry albums